Caravan Film is a London, UK based independent film production company headed by feature and documentary filmmakers Leon & David Flamholc. They produce both documentaries and feature films, as well as shorts and animation.

Documentary films
 Search for the Lost Treasure of Afghanistan
 Sacred Sierra, the film
 House of the Tiger King, based on the Tahir Shah book by the same name
 Search for the Lost City of Gold
 Pro Stock Doc, the film
 Exorcism in Casablanca, an eyewitness documentary based on events from Tahir Shah's book The Caliph's House
 Looking at the Stars
 Svitjod 2000+
 I Believe
 Racist Sweden?
 A Winter in Herat
 Pulse, a series of four films set in Tel Aviv, Stockholm, London And Barcelona
 Cheeboom Cheeboom
 Radio Sweden, a series of three informational films, including: Run to The Rock, This is a Hold Up, My Name is Tomorrow

Feature films
 Flip A Coin
 Sherdil
 Lithivm
 Nattbus 807
 Summertime

Shorts & Animation
 Marauder
 Animation Showreel

Film production companies of the United Kingdom